Onka's Big Moka is the debut studio album by English band Toploader. It was released on 11 November 1999, through S2 Records. And produced by long time collaborator of the Manic Street Preachers, Dave Eringa. The album reached the Top 5 of the UK Albums Chart at number 4, where it stayed for six months.

The song "Dancing in the Moonlight", a cover of the King Harvest song, was later featured in television commercials for the supermarket chain Sainsbury's, on the soundtrack of the 2002 American coming-of-age teen romantic drama A Walk to Remember, the 2010 comedy film Four Lions, and the 2019 television series The Umbrella Academy.

The album cover was taken at Lancaster Gate, located in the Bayswater district of Central London.

The title is a reference to a 1974 anthropological documentary Ongka's Big Moka: The Kawelka of Papua New Guinea.

Track listing 
All tracks written by Joseph Washbourn except tracks 2 & 7.
"Let the People Know" – 3:54
"Dancing in the Moonlight" (Sherman Kelly) – 3:52
"Achilles Heel" – 4:18
"Breathe" – 3:56
"Do You Know What Your Future Will Be?" – 4:24
"Only for a While" – 3:51
"Just Hold On" (Dave Smith, Tim Woodcock, Mike Terry) – 4:01
"Higher State" – 3:11
"High Flying Bird" – 4:10
"Summer Cycle" – 4:38
"Just About Living" – 4:01
"Floating Away (In a Bath Tub)" – 3:22

Charts

Weekly charts

Year-end charts

Certifications

References

1999 debut albums
Toploader albums
S2 Records albums
Albums produced by Stargate
Albums recorded at RAK Studios